Mariano Moro is a municipality in the state of Rio Grande do Sul, Brazil.

Geography 
It belongs to the Northwest Grandense Mesoregion River and the Erechim Microregion. It is a municipality that includes the waters of the Uruguay River and is fluvial border with the state of Santa Catarina.  As of 2020, the estimated population was 2,009.

See also
List of municipalities in Rio Grande do Sul

References

Municipalities in Rio Grande do Sul